Piper Dinita Griffin (born February 2, 1962) is an American judge who is an associate justice of the Louisiana Supreme Court.

Early life and education 

A lifelong resident of New Orleans, Griffin attended Xavier University Preparatory School. Griffin graduated from the University of Notre Dame in 1984 with a Bachelor of Arts in Government. She received her Juris Doctor from Louisiana State University's Paul M. Hebert Law Center in 1987

State judicial career 

In 2001, Griffin was elected to the Orleans Parish Civil District Court. She has chaired numerous judicial committees and as well as serving as chief judge. In 2019, Griffin was elected as Second Vice President of the Louisiana District Judges Associations.

Louisiana Supreme Court 

In July 2020, Griffin announced her candidacy for associate justice of the Louisiana Supreme Court. In November 2020, Griffin won election to her seat outright after her opponent dropped out, cancelling a runoff election.

Awards and recognition

Committees and memberships 

Griffin was the first African American woman to serve as chairperson of the Young Lawyers section of the New Orleans Bar Association and the first African American woman to serve as a Louisiana Bar examiner. She is a current board member and former president (2015-2019) St Katharine Drexel Preparatory School (formerly Xavier University Preparatory School) She is the former president of the Crescent City Chapter of Links (2015–2019), past member of the United Way Agency Relations Committee, past-president and treasurer of the Greater New Orleans YWCA, and past board member of Catholic Charities of New Orleans.

References

1962 births
Living people
African-American judges
Justices of the Louisiana Supreme Court
Lawyers from New Orleans
Louisiana state court judges
Politicians from New Orleans
21st-century American judges
21st-century American women judges
21st-century African-American women
21st-century African-American people
20th-century African-American people
20th-century African-American women